John P. Walsh is a sociologist and a Professor of Public Policy at Georgia Institute of Technology. His research interests include the study of innovation, sociology of science and the sociology of work and organizations.

Selected publications
 2012. Shibayama, Sotaro, John P. Walsh and Yasunori Baba. "Academic Entrepreneurship and Exchange of Scientific Resources: Material Transfer in Life and Material Sciences in Japanese Universities." American Sociological Review 77(5): 804-830.
 2011. John P. Walsh and HONG Wei. "A review on technology transfer systems in American universities." [In Chinese]. Studies in Science of Science 29(5): 641-649.
 2010. Tang, Li and John P. Walsh. "Bibliometric fingerprints: name disambiguation based on approximate structure equivalence of cognitive maps." Scientometrics 84(3): 763-784.
 2010. Clark, Jennifer, Hsin-I Huang and John P. Walsh. "A typology of 'innovation districts': what it means for regional resilience." Cambridge Journal of Regions, Economy and Society 3(1): 121-137.
 2010. Baba, Yasunori and John P. Walsh. "Embeddedness, social epistemology and breakthrough innovation: the case of the development of statins." Research Policy 39(4): 511-522.
 2010. No, Yeonji and John P. Walsh. "The Importance of Foreign-Born Talent for US Innovation." Nature Biotechnology 28(3): 289-291.
 2009. Hong, Wei and John P. Walsh. Forthcoming. "For Money or Glory?: Commercialization, Competition and Secrecy in the Entrepreneurial University." Sociological Quarterly 50:145-171.
 2008. Cohen, W.M. and J.P. Walsh. "Real impediments to biomedical research." Innovation Policy and the Economy 8:1-30.
 2008. Walsh, John P., Yasunori Baba, Akira Goto, Yoshihito Yasaki. 2008. "Promoting University-Industry Linkages in Japan: Faculty Responses to a Changing Policy Environment." Prometheus 26: 39-54.
 2007. Walsh, John P., Wesley M. Cohen and Charlene Cho. "Where excludability matters: material versus intellectual property in academic biomedical research." Research Policy 36:1184-1203.
 2007. Walsh, J.P. and N.G. Maloney. "Collaboration Structure, Communication Media and Problems in Scientific Work Teams." Journal of Computer-Mediated Communication 12(2), article 19.

External links
 Faculty profile at Georgia Tech
 Personal page

Living people
Year of birth missing (living people)
Georgia Tech faculty